The Revelers are a Louisiana music group, composed of founding members of the Red Stick Ramblers and the Pine Leaf Boys. They are unique in that they play all styles of Cajun, zydeco, Swamp Pop, and Americana equally well. There is no leader and everyone sings and writes music. Blake Miller (accordion, fiddle, voice) is currently one of the most prolific composers of original French Cajun music.

Origin 
The Revelers were founded in 2010. Longtime collaborator Chris Miller joined the band full-time in January 2013 and Trey Boudreaux joined the band in 2017. The band relocated from Lafayette to Breaux Bridge, Louisiana in 2018

Career 

The Revelers have toured the United States and Canada extensively, the UK, Ireland, and Denmark. They are a festival mainstay having played at the Blackpot Festival, Tønder, Shakori Hills, both Rhythm and Roots, Wheatland, Sugar Maple Fest, Festival International de Louisiane, Grey Fox, Clearwater's Hudson River Revival, the Red Wing Roots Music Festival and countless others. They are also in-demand in the music education scene, having been on staff at Ashokan Fiddle & Dance, Balfa Week, Miles of Music Camp, FiddleTunes, and Blackpot Camp.

Awards 
2016 Grammy Nomination for Best Regional Roots Music (Get Ready)

The Revelers have been named "The Best Thing to come out of Louisiana in Recent History" by the Cajun Creole Culture Preservation International™

Discography 
 The Revelers (2012) Independent.
 The Revelers Play the Swamp Pop Classics Vol. 1 (2014) Independent.
 Get Ready (2015) Independent.
 The Revelers Play The Swamp Pop Classics Volume 2 (2016) Independent.

References 

American folk musical groups
Acadiana
Musical groups from Louisiana
Cajun accordionists